Melanie Hauss, née Annaheim (born 20 December 1982 in Lostorf) is a Swiss professional triathlete, member of the National Team (i.e. the Team London 2012) and bronze medalist of the 2009 Swiss Championships.

In France, together with Céline Schärer Melanie Annaheim takes part in the prestigious Club Championship Series Lyonnaise des Eaux and represents TCC 36 (Triathlon Club Châteauroux 36 (FRA)). At the first triathlon of the 2010 circuit in Dunkirk, for instance, she placed 18th and her club, which did not nominate any French triathletes at all, placed 2nd, with Magali Di Marco Messmer, Svenja Bazlen and Ricarda Lisk being the three .
At the Grand Final of the 2012 Grand Prix de Triathlon in Nice, Melanie Hauss placed 4th in the individual ranking, in the club ranking she won the bronze medal being the top athlete of TCC 36, which placed 4th in the Club Championship Series 2012.

In Switzerland, Annaheim represents Leichtathletik Club Regensdorf in the Canton of Zürich. By profession, she is a marketing assistant, she lives in Lostorf and is coached by Magali Di Marco Messmer. Her younger brother Matthias Annaheim is also a triathlete.
In September 2012, Melanie Annaheim married the French triathlete David Hauss.

ITU Competitions 
In the nine years from 2004 to 2012, Melanie Hauss took part in 63 ITU competitions and achieved 17 top ten positions.

The following list is based upon the official ITU rankings and the Athlete's Profile Page. Unless indicated otherwise, the following events are triathlons (Olympic Distance) and belong to the Elite category.

BG = the sponsor British Gas · DNF = did not finish · DNS = did not start

Gallery

External links
 Melanie Annaheim's Webpage

Notes

1982 births
Living people
People from Gösgen District
Swiss female triathletes
Sportspeople from the canton of Solothurn